Batrachedra parvulipunctella is a species of moth of the family Batrachedridae. It is found from most of Europe (except most of the Balkan Peninsula) east through the  Caucasus and southern Siberia to the Russian Far East.

The wingspan is 9–13 mm. The forewings are mostly yellow while the hindwings are grey. Adults are on wing from mid June to August or September in one generation per year.

The larvae feed on Abies, Picea and Pinus species. Young larvae mine the needles of their host plant. Larvae can be found from September to May.

References

External links
 Lepiforum e. V.

Batrachedridae
Moths described in 1839
Moths of Japan
Moths of Europe